Paradise is Lil Suzy's fourth and final studio album to date. It was issued on 8 July 1997 by the Metropolitan Recording Corporation. It contains the singles "Can't Get You Out of My Mind" and "I Still Love You", which reached No. 79 and No. 94 on the Billboard Hot 100, respectively. The track, "You're the Only One", was later released as a single in 1999 as part of the compilation The MegaMix. Other tracks of note are "Memories", a cover of the group Netzwerk, and "Love Letter Lost", a collaboration with Crystal Waters.

Track listing

Charts
Singles - Billboard

References

Lil Suzy albums
1997 albums